Higgie is a surname. Notable people with the surname include:

Jennifer Higgie (born 1962), Australian writer
Mark Higgie (born 1957), Australian diplomat, political advisor, and intelligence analyst
Megan Higgie (born 1977), New Zealand-born, Australian-based scientist and academic
Suzie Higgie, Australian musician